Kim Un-jong (born ) is a North Korean artistic gymnast, representing her nation at international competitions.

She participated at the 2004 Summer Olympics.

References

1986 births
Living people
North Korean female artistic gymnasts
Place of birth missing (living people)
Gymnasts at the 2004 Summer Olympics
Olympic gymnasts of North Korea
Gymnasts at the 2002 Asian Games
Asian Games medalists in gymnastics
Asian Games silver medalists for North Korea
Medalists at the 2002 Asian Games
21st-century North Korean women